Parasqualodon is an extinct genus of toothed whale from the Oligocene. It contains a single species, Parasqualodon wilkinsoni. It has been suggested that the taxon constitutes a nomen dubium.

References

Prehistoric toothed whales
Nomina dubia
Oligocene cetaceans